Diamonds, also known as The Diamond is a rural hamlet in Saint Peter, Antigua and Barbuda.

Diamonds takes up 31.26% of the land area of the Parish of Saint Peter.

Betty's Hope is located in Diamonds.

History

Diamonds Estate (Mill) 
The adjoining cattle corral is still standing, and the mill is in fantastic condition. The house was modest in size compared to many estate homes, but it was beautifully constructed with 2 to 3 inch thick walls. It had two levels and was made of stone, with the ground floor being utilized for storage. In addition to from the kitchen into a walled courtyard, stairs led up to the front and back of the house. The gardens on each side of the front were large enough to accommodate an open garden seating area that could be accessed directly from the living room and provided an elevated perspective of the land. It was a remarkably strong and compact building designed for security. A tennis court and bench were located on the front lawn, where family and friends could play pleasant matches under the shade of a Scarlet Cordia tree. The surrounding area was extremely flat and arable. Cochran's (#83), Sanderson's (#86), Duer's (#89), and Parry's (#88) are nearby estates. When the Syndicate Estates failed, the government took control of Diamond Estate and converted it into an agricultural farm. After being out of use in 2001, the government brought it back in 2007.

Territorial Evolution 

 1700 - 122 acres
 1755 - 126 acres
 1829 - 134 acres
 1941 - 167 acres

Demographics 
Diamonds has one enumeration district, ED 51400.

Diamonds had 84 slaves in 1829, when it was sized at 134 acres.

Census Data (2011) 
Source:

References 

Saint Peter Parish, Antigua and Barbuda
Populated places in Antigua and Barbuda